Sir James Dundas Harford   (7 January 1899 – 26 November 1993) was a British diplomat who served as Governor of Saint Helena from 1954 to 1958.

Biography
A direct descendant of John Scandrett Harford of Blaise Castle, he was educated at Repton School and Balliol College, Oxford. Between school and university he enlisted as a second lieutenant in 2nd Battalion Essex Regiment and saw action in France between 1917 and 1918. After a period as a schoolmaster at Eton College from 1922 to 1926, Harford joined the Colonial Administration Service and was posted to Nigeria (1926–1934).

He was subsequently appointed:
 Administrator of Antigua and Federal Secretary of the Leeward Islands (1936–1940);
 Administrator of Saint Kitts and Nevis (1940–1946);
 Acting Governor of the Leeward Islands (various periods between 1937 and 1946);
 Companion of the Order of St Michael and St George (1943);
 To serve in the Colonial Office (1946–1947);
 Colonial Secretary of Mauritius (1948–1953);
 Acting Governor of Mauritius (1948 and 1950);
 Governor and Commander-in-Chief of Saint Helena (1954–1958);
 Knight Commander of the Order of the British Empire (1956).

Harford Middle School in Saint Helena is named in his honour.

He was married twice:
 (14 March 1932) to Countess Thelma Alberta Louisa Evelyne Metaxà (died 22 October 1934), sister of 9th Count Metaxà, and only daughter of Count Andrea Francis Albert Cochrane Metaxà RNR; 1 son.
 (20 February 1937) to Lilias Madeline (died 9 December 2006), eldest daughter of Major Archibald Campbell AEC; 2 daughters.

References

External links 
 Harford Middle School

1899 births
1993 deaths
Governors of the Leeward Islands
Essex Regiment officers
British Army personnel of World War I
People educated at Repton School
Alumni of Balliol College, Oxford
Knights Commander of the Order of the British Empire
Companions of the Order of St Michael and St George
Governors of Saint Helena
British diplomats
British Leeward Islands people of World War II
Governors of Saint Christopher-Nevis-Anguilla
Colonial Secretaries of Mauritius
Governors of British Mauritius
Governors of Antigua and Barbuda
British colonial governors and administrators in the Americas
British colonial governors and administrators in Africa